The swimming competition at the 2010 South Asian Games held in Dhaka, Bangladesh.

Results

Men's events

Women's events

References

Swimming at the South Asian Games
2010 South Asian Games
2010 in swimming